Darshan is an Indian actor and film producer known for his work in Kannada cinema. He is the son of actor Thoogudeepa Srinivas. Darshan initially worked in trivial roles in few films and television serial's, later made his debut in a lead role in 2001 film, Majestic, and has since then starred in many commercial and critical hit films such as  Kariya (2003),  Namma Preethiya Ramu (2003), Kalasipalya (2005), Gaja (2008), Saarathi (2011), Chingari (2012)  Krantiveera Sangolli Rayanna (2012), Bulbul (2013), Ambareesha (2014), Mr. Airavata (2015), Tarak (2017), Yajamana (2019) and Kurukshetra (2019). He has also given his voice for the introduction of Ramadhanya.

Filmography

As actor

Producer

Jothe Jotheyali (2006)
Navagraha (2008)
Bulbul (2013)
Maduveya Mamatheya Kareyole (2016)

Distribution

 Bulbul (2013)
 Brindavana (2013)
 Ugramm (2014)
 Oggarane (2014)
 Jai Lalitha (2014)
 Paramashiva (2014)
 Jai Bajarangabali (2014)
 Rhaatee (2015)
 Buguri (2015)
 Maduveya Mamatheya Kareyole (2016)
 Devara Naadalli (2016)
 Neer Dose (2016)
 Pushpaka Vimana (2017)
Melkote Manja (2017)
Life Jothe Ondu Selfie (2018)

As Narrator
 Dasharatha (2019)
 Ombattane Dikku (2022)

Discography

As Playback Singer
 Saarathi (2011) - Haago Heege
 Ambareesha (2014) - Khel Khatam
 Dasharatha (2019) - Dasharatha Title Track

References

External links
 

Indian filmographies
Male actor filmographies